This is a list of published International Organization for Standardization (ISO) standards and other deliverables. For a complete and up-to-date list of all the ISO standards, see the ISO catalogue.

The standards are protected by copyright and most of them must be purchased. However, about 300 of the standards produced by ISO and IEC's Joint Technical Committee 1 (JTC 1) have been made freely and publicly available.

ISO 8000 – ISO 8999

 ISO 8000 Data quality
 ISO 8002:1986 Mechanical vibrations – Land vehicles – Method for reporting measured data
 ISO 8015:2011 Geometrical product specifications (GPS) – Fundamentals – Concepts, principles and rules
 ISO 8041:2005 Human response to vibration - Measuring instrumentation
 ISO 8041-1:2017 Part 1: General purpose vibration meters
 ISO 8042:1988 Shock and vibration measurements – Characteristics to be specified for seismic pick-ups
 ISO 8044:2015 Corrosion of metals and alloys – Basic terms and definitions
 ISO 8048:1984 Technical drawings – Construction drawings – Representation of views, sections and cuts
 ISO 8049:2016 Ferronickel shot - Sampling for analysis
 ISO 8050:1988 Ferronickel ingots or pieces - Sampling for analysis
 ISO 8062 Geometrical product specifications (GPS) - Dimensional and geometrical tolerances for moulded parts
 ISO 8062-1:2007 Part 1: Vocabulary
 ISO/TS 8062-2:2013 Part 2: Rules
 ISO 8062-3:2007 Part 3: General dimensional and geometrical tolerances and machining allowances for castings
 ISO 8062-4:2017 Part 4: General tolerances for castings using profile tolerancing in a general datum system
 ISO 8063 Information processing – Data interchange on 6,30 mm (0.25 in) wide magnetic tape cartridge using IMFM recording at 252 ftpmm (6 400 ftpi)
 ISO 8063-1:1986 Part 1: Mechanical, physical and magnetic properties
 ISO 8063-2:1986 Part 2: Track format and method of recording for data interchange in start/stop mode
 ISO 8064:1985 Information processing – Reels for 12,7 mm (0,5 in) wide magnetic tapes – Sizes 16, 18 and 22
 ISO/IEC 8072:1996 Information technology – Open systems interconnection – Transport service definition
 ISO/IEC 8073:1997 Information technology – Open Systems Interconnection – Protocol for providing the connection-mode transport service
 ISO 8088:1994 Equipment for olive cultivation and olive oil production – Vocabulary
 ISO 8090:1990 Cycles – Terminology
 ISO 8107:1993 Nuclear power plants - Maintainability - Terminology
 ISO 8109:1990 Banking and related financial services – Securities – Format of Eurobonds
 ISO 8114:1990 Textile machinery and accessories – Spindles for ring-spinning and doubling machines – List of equivalent terms
 ISO 8116 Textile machinery and accessories – Beams for winding
 ISO 8116-1:1995 Part 1: General vocabulary
 ISO 8119 Textile machinery and accessories – Needles for knitting machines – Terminology
 ISO 8119-1:1989 Part 1: Latch-type needles
 ISO 8119-2:1989 Part 2: Bearded needles
 ISO 8119-3:1992 Part 3: Compound needles
 ISO 8147:1995 Shipbuilding and marine structures – Derrick rigs and component parts – Vocabulary
 ISO 8152:1984 Earth-moving machinery – Operation and maintenance – Training of mechanics
 ISO 8153 Aerospace fluid systems and components – Vocabulary
 ISO 8153-1:2009 Part 1: Hose assemblies
 ISO 8157:2015 Fertilizers and soil conditioners – Vocabulary
 ISO 8159:1987 Textiles – Morphology of fibres and yarns – Vocabulary
 ISO 8160:1987 Textiles – Textured filament yarns – Vocabulary
 ISO 8178 Reciprocating internal combustion engines - Exhaust emission measurement
 ISO 8180 Ductile iron pipelines – Polyethylene sleeving for site application
 ISO 8199:2005 Water quality – General guidance on the enumeration of micro-organisms by culture
 ISO/IEC 8208:2000 Information technology – Data communications – X.25 Packet Layer Protocol for Data Terminal Equipment
 ISO/IEC 8211:1994 Information technology - Specification for a data descriptive file for information interchange
 ISO 8217:2017 Petroleum products - Fuels (class F) - Specifications of marine fuels
 ISO 8229:1991 Operations and baths relating to dry-cleaning machines – Vocabulary
 ISO 8277:2013 Ships and marine technology – Pipework and machinery – Information transfer
 ISO 8297:1994 Acoustics – Determination of sound power levels of multisource industrial plants for evaluation of sound pressure levels in the environment – Engineering method
 ISO 8316:1987 Measurement of liquid flow in closed conduits – Method by collection of the liquid in a volumetric tank
 ISO 8317:2015 Child-resistant packaging - Requirements and testing procedures for reclosable packages
 ISO 8319 Orthopaedic instruments – Drive connections
 ISO 8319-1:1996 Part 1: Keys for use with screws with hexagon socket heads
 ISO 8319-2:1986 Part 2: Screwdrivers for single slot head screws, screws with cruciate slot and cross-recessed head screws
 ISO/IEC 8326:1996 Information technology – Open Systems Interconnection – Session service definition
 ISO/IEC 8327 Information technology – Open Systems Interconnection – Connection-oriented Session protocol
 ISO/IEC 8327-1:1996 Protocol specification
 ISO/IEC 8327-2:1996 Protocol Implementation Conformance Statement (PICS) proforma
 ISO 8330:2014 Rubber and plastics hoses and hose assemblies - Vocabulary
 ISO 8333:1985 Liquid flow measurement in open channels by weirs and flumes – V-shaped broad-crested weirs
 ISO 8343:1985 Ferronickel - Determination of silicon content - Gravimetric method
 ISO/IEC 8348:2002 Information technology – Open Systems Interconnection – Network service definition
 ISO 8362 Injection containers and accessories
 ISO 8362-1:2009 Part 1: Injection vials made of glass tubing
 ISO 8362-2:2015 Part 2: Closures for injection vials
 ISO 8362-3:2001 Part 3: Aluminium caps for injection vials
 ISO 8362-4:2011 Part 4: Injection vials made of moulded glass
 ISO 8362-5:2016 Part 5: Freeze drying closures for injection vials
 ISO 8362-6:2010 Part 6: Caps made of aluminium-plastics combinations for injection vials
 ISO 8362-7:2006 Part 7: Injection caps made of aluminium-plastics combinations without overlapping plastics part
 ISO/TR 8363:1997 Measurement of liquid flow in open channels — General guidelines for selection of method [Withdrawn: replaced by ISO 18365]
 ISO 8368:1999 Hydrometric determinations – Flow measurements in open channels using structures – Guidelines for selection of structure
 ISO 8373:2012 Manipulating industrial robots – Vocabulary
 ISO 8378 Information processing – Data interchange on 130 mm (5.25 in) flexible disk cartridges using modified frequency modulation recording at 7 958 ftprad, 3,8 tpmm (96 tpi), on both sides
 ISO 8378-1:1986 Part 1: Dimensional, physical and magnetic characteristics
 ISO 8378-2:1986 Part 2: Track format A
 ISO 8378-3:1986 Part 3: Track format B
 ISO 8384:2000 Ships and marine technology – Dredgers – Vocabulary
 ISO 8388:1998 Knitted fabrics – Types – Vocabulary
 ISO 8421 Fire protection - Vocabulary
 ISO 8421-1:1987 Part 1: General terms and phenomena of fire
 ISO 8421-2:1987 Part 2: Structural fire protection
 ISO 8421-6:1987 Part 6: Evacuation and means of escape
 ISO 8421-7:1987 Part 7: Explosion detection and suppression means
 ISO 8422:2006 Sequential sampling plans for inspection by attributes
 ISO 8423:2008 Sequential sampling plans for inspection by variables for percent nonconforming (known standard deviation)
 ISO 8429:1986 Optics and optical instruments – Ophthalmology – Graduated dial scale
 ISO 8439:1990 Forms design - Basic layout
 ISO 8440:1986 Location of codes in trade documents
 ISO/IEC 8441 Information technology – High density digital recording (HDDR)
 ISO/IEC 8441-1:1991 Part 1: Unrecorded magnetic tape for (HDDR) applications
 ISO/IEC 8441-2:1991 Part 2: Guide for interchange practice
 ISO 8459:2009 Information and documentation - Bibliographic data element directory for use in data exchange and enquiry
 ISO 8462 Information processing – Data interchange on 6,30 mm (0.25 in) magnetic tape cartridge using GCR recording at 394 ftpmm (10 000 ftpi), 39 cpmm (1 000 cpi)
 ISO 8462-1:1986 Part 1: Mechanical, physical and magnetic properties
 ISO 8462-2:1986 Part 2: Streaming mode
 ISO/IEC 8473 Information technology – Protocol for providing the connectionless-mode network service
 ISO/IEC 8473-1:1998 Protocol specification
 ISO/IEC 8473-2:1996 Part 2: Provision of the underlying service by an ISO/IEC 8802 subnetwork
 ISO/IEC 8473-3:1995 Provision of the underlying service by an X.25 subnetwork
 ISO/IEC 8473-4:1995 Provision of the underlying service by a subnetwork that provides the OSI data link service
 ISO/IEC 8473-5:1997 Provision of the underlying service by ISDN circuit-switched B-channels
 ISO/IEC 8480:1995 Information technology – Telecommunications and information exchange between systems – DTE/DCE interface back-up control operation using ITU-T Recommendation V.24 interchange circuits
 ISO/IEC 8481:1996 Information technology – Telecommunications and information exchange between systems – DTE to DTE direct connections
 ISO/IEC 8482:1993 Information technology – Telecommunications and information exchange between systems – Twisted pair multipoint interconnections
 ISO/IEC 8484:2014 Information technology – Magnetic stripes on savingsbooks
 ISO 8485:1989 Programming languages - APL
 ISO 8498:1990 Woven fabrics – Description of defects – Vocabulary
 ISO 8499:2003 Knitted fabrics – Description of defects – Vocabulary
 ISO 8501 Preparation of steel substrates before application of paints and related products – Visual assessment of surface cleanliness
 ISO 8501-1:2007 Part 1: Rust grades and preparation grades of uncoated steel substrates and of steel substrates after overall removal of previous coatings
 ISO 8501-2:1994 Part 2: Preparation grades of previously coated steel substrates after localized removal of previous coatings
 ISO 8501-3:2006 Part 3: Preparation grades of welds, edges and other areas with surface imperfections
 ISO 8501-4:2006 Part 4: Initial surface conditions, preparation grades and flash rust grades in connection with high-pressure water jetting
 ISO 8502 Preparation of steel substrates before application of paints and related products - Tests for the assessment of surface cleanliness
 ISO 8502-2:2017 Part 2: Laboratory determination of chloride on cleaned surfaces
 ISO 8502-3:2017 Part 3: Assessment of dust on steel surfaces prepared for painting (pressure-sensitive tape method)
 ISO 8502-4:2017 Part 4: Guidance on the estimation of the probability of condensation prior to paint application
 ISO 8502-5:1998 Part 5: Measurement of chloride on steel surfaces prepared for painting (ion detection tube method
 ISO 8502-6:2006 Part 6: Extraction of soluble contaminants for analysis - The Bresle method
 ISO 8502-9:1998 Part 9: Field method for the conductometric determination of water-soluble salts
 ISO 8502-11:2006 Part 11: Field method for the turbidimetric determination of water-soluble sulfate
 ISO 8503 Preparation of steel substrates before application of paints and related products - Surface roughness characteristics of blast-cleaned steel substrates 
 ISO 8503-1:2012 Part 1: Specifications and definitions for ISO surface profile comparators for the assessment of abrasive blast-cleaned surfaces
 ISO 8503-2:2012 Part 2: Method for the grading of surface profile of abrasive blast-cleaned steel - Comparator procedure
 ISO 8503-3:2012 Part 3: Method for the calibration of ISO surface profile comparators and for the determination of surface profile - Focusing microscope procedure
 ISO 8503-4:2012 Part 4: Method for the calibration of ISO surface profile comparators and for the determination of surface profile - Stylus instrument procedure
 ISO 8503-5:2017 Part 5: Replica tape method for the determination of the surface profile
 ISO 8504 Preparation of steel substrates before application of paints and related products - Surface preparation methods
 ISO 8504-1:2000 Part 1: General principles
 ISO 8504-2:2000 Part 2: Abrasive blast-cleaning
 ISO 8504-3:1993 Part 3: Hand- and power-tool cleaning
 ISO 8512 Surface plates
 ISO 8512-1:1990 Part 1: Cast iron
 ISO 8512-2:1990 Part 2: Granite
 ISO/TR 8517:1988 Rubber- or plastics-covered rollers – Glossary
 ISO 8525:2008 Airborne noise emitted by machine tools – Operating conditions for metal-cutting machines
 ISO 8528 Reciprocating internal combustion engine driven alternating current generating sets
 ISO 8528-1:2005 Part 1: Application, ratings and performance
 ISO 8528-2:2005 Part 2: Engines
 ISO 8528-3:2005 Part 3: Alternating current generators for generating sets
 ISO 8528-4:2005 Part 4: Controlgear and switchgear
 ISO 8528-5:2013 Part 5: Generating sets
 ISO 8528-6:2005 Part 6: Test methods
 ISO 8528-7:2017 Part 7: Technical declarations for specification and design
 ISO 8528-8:2016 Part 8: Requirements and tests for low-power generating sets 
 ISO 8528-9:2017 Part 9: Measurement and evaluation of mechanical vibrations
 ISO 8528-10:1998 Part 10: Measurement of airborne noise by the enveloping surface method
 ISO 8528-12:1997 Part 12: Emergency power supply to safety services
 ISO 8528-13:2016 Part 13: Safety
 ISO 8529 Reference neutron radiations
 ISO 8529-1:2001 Part 1: Characteristics and methods of production
 ISO 8529-2:2000 Part 2: Calibration fundamentals of radiation protection devices related to the basic quantities characterizing the radiation field
 ISO 8529-3:1998 Part 3: Calibration of area and personal dosimeters and determination of response as a function of energy and angle of incidence
 ISO 8532:1995 Securities – Format for transmission of certificate numbers
 ISO 8536 Infusion equipment for medical use
 ISO 8536-1:2011 Part 1: Infusion glass bottles
 ISO 8536-2:2010 Part 2: Closures for infusion bottles
 ISO 8536-3:2009 Part 3: Aluminium caps for infusion bottles
 ISO 8536-4:2010 Part 4: Infusion sets for single use, gravity feed
 ISO 8536-5:2004 Part 5: Burette infusion sets for single use, gravity feed
 ISO 8536-6:2016 Part 6: Freeze drying closures for infusion bottles
 ISO 8536-7:2009 Part 7: Caps made of aluminium-plastics combinations for infusion bottles
 ISO 8536-8:2015 Part 8: Infusion sets for single use with pressure infusion apparatus
 ISO 8536-9:2015 Part 9: Fluid lines for single use with pressure infusion equipment
 ISO 8536-10:2015 Part 10: Accessories for fluid lines for single use with pressure infusion equipment
 ISO 8536-11:2015 Part 11: Infusion filters for single use with pressure infusion equipment
 ISO 8536-12:2007 Part 12: Check valves
 ISO 8536-13:2016 Part 13: Graduated flow regulators for single use with fluid contact
 ISO 8536-14:2016 Part 14: Clamps and flow regulators for transfusion and infusion equipment without fluid contact
 ISO 8537:2016 Sterile single-use syringes, with or without needle, for insulin
 ISO 8540:1993 Open front mechanical power presses - Vocabulary
 ISO 8548 Prosthetics and orthotics – Limb deficiencies
 ISO 8548-1:1989 Part 1: Method of describing limb deficiencies present at birth
 ISO 8548-2:1993 Part 2: Method of describing lower limb amputation stumps
 ISO 8548-3:1993 Part 3: Method of describing upper limb amputation stumps
 ISO 8548-4:1998 Part 4: Description of causal conditions leading to amputation
 ISO 8548-5:2003 Part 5: Description of the clinical condition of the person who has had an amputation
 ISO 8549 Prosthetics and orthotics - Vocabulary
 ISO 8549-1:1989 Part 1: General terms for external limb prostheses and external orthoses
 ISO 8549-2:1989 Part 2: Terms relating to external limb prostheses and wearers of these prostheses
 ISO 8549-3:1989 Part 3: Terms relating to external orthoses
 ISO 8549-4:2014 Part 4: Terms relating to limb amputation
 ISO/TR 8550 Guidance on the selection and usage of acceptance sampling systems for inspection of discrete items in lots
 ISO/TR 8550-1:2007 Part 1: Acceptance sampling
 ISO/TR 8550-2:2007 Part 2: Sampling by attributes
 ISO/TR 8550-3:2007 Part 3: Sampling by variables
 ISO 8551:2003 Prosthetics and orthotics – Functional deficiencies – Description of the person to be treated with an orthosis, clinical objectives of treatment, and functional requirements of the orthosis
 ISO 8552:2004 Milk – Estimation of psychrotrophic microorganisms – Colony-count technique at 21 degrees C (Rapid method)
 ISO 8553:2004 Milk – Enumeration of microorganisms – Plate-loop technique at 30 degrees C
 ISO 8559:1989 Garment construction and anthropometric surveys – Body dimensions [Withdrawn: replaced by ISO 8559-1:2017]
 ISO 8559 Size designation of clothes
 ISO 8559-1:2017 Part 1: Anthropometric definitions for body measurement
 ISO 8559-2:2017 Part 2: Primary and secondary dimension indicators
 ISO 8560:1986 Technical drawings – Construction drawings – Representation of modular sizes, lines and grids
 ISO 8568:2007 Mechanical shock – Testing machines – Characteristics and performance
 ISO 8571 Information processing systems - Open Systems Interconnection - File Transfer, Access and Management
 ISO 8571-1:1988 Part 1: General introduction
 ISO 8571-2:1988 Part 2: Virtual Filestore Definition
 ISO 8571-3:1988 Part 3: File Service Definition
 ISO 8571-4:1988 Part 4: File Protocol Specification
 ISO/IEC 8571-5:1990 Part 5: Protocol Implementation Conformance Statement Proforma
 ISO 8573 Compressed air
 ISO 8573-1:2010 Contaminants and purity classes
 ISO 8573-2:2007 Test methods for oil aerosol content
 ISO 8573-3:1999 Test methods for measurement of humidity
 ISO 8573-4:2001 Test methods for solid particle content
 ISO 8573-5:2001 Test methods for oil vapour and organic solvent content
 ISO 8573-6:2003 Test methods for gaseous contaminant content
 ISO 8573-7:2003 Test method for viable microbiological contaminant content
 ISO 8573-8:2004 Test methods for solid particle content by mass concentration
 ISO 8573-9:2004 Test methods for liquid water content
 ISO 8579 Acceptance code for gear units
 ISO 8579-1:2002 Part 1: Test code for airborne sound
 ISO 8583 Financial transaction card originated messages – Interchange message specifications
 ISO 8586:2012 Sensory analysis – General guidelines for the selection, training and monitoring of selected assessors and expert sensory assessors
 ISO 8596:2009 Ophthalmic optics – Visual acuity testing – Standard optotype and its presentation
 ISO 8598 Optics and optical instruments – Focimeters
 ISO 8598-1:2014 Part 1: General purpose instruments
 ISO 8600 Endoscopes – Medical endoscopes and endotherapy devices
 ISO 8600-1:2015 Part 1: General requirements
 ISO 8600-2:2015 Part 2: Particular requirements for rigid bronchoscopes
 ISO 8600-3:1997 Part 3: Determination of field of view and direction of view of endoscopes with optics
 ISO 8600-4:2014 Part 4: Determination of maximum width of insertion portion
 ISO 8600-5:2005 Part 5: Determination of optical resolution of rigid endoscopes with optics
 ISO 8600-6:2005 Part 6: Vocabulary
 ISO 8600-7:2012 Part 7: Basic requirements for medical endoscopes of water-resistant type
 ISO 8601:2019 Data elements and interchange formats – Information interchange – Representation of dates and times
 ISO/IEC 8602:1995 Information technology – Protocol for providing the OSI connectionless-mode transport service
 ISO 8604:1988 Plastics – Prepregs – Definitions of terms and symbols for designations
 ISO 8608:2016 Mechanical vibration – Road surface profiles – Reporting of measured data
 ISO 8612:2009 Ophthalmic instruments – Tonometers
 ISO/IEC 8613 Information technology – Open Document Architecture (ODA) and interchange format
 ISO 8614:1997 Ski bindings – Vocabulary
 ISO 8615:1991 Implants for surgery – Fixation devices for use in the ends of the femur in adults
 ISO 8624:2011 Ophthalmic optics – Spectacle frames – Measuring system and terminology
 ISO 8625 Aerospace – Fluid systems – Vocabulary
 ISO 8625-1:1993 Part 1: General terms and definitions related to pressure
 ISO 8625-2:1991 Part 2: General terms and definitions relating to flow
 ISO 8625-3:1991 Part 3: General terms and definitions relating to temperature
 ISO 8625-4:2011 Part 4: General terms and definitions relating to control/actuation systems
 ISO 8626:1989 Servo-hydraulic test equipment for generating vibration – Method of describing characteristics
 ISO 8630 Information processing – Data interchange on 130 mm (5.25 in) flexible disk cartridges using modified frequency modulation recording at 13 262 ftprad, on 80 tracks on each side
 ISO 8630-1:1987 Part 1: Dimensional, physical and magnetic characteristics
 ISO 8630-2:1987 Part 2: Track format A for 77 tracks
 ISO 8630-3:1987 Part 3: Track format B for 80 tracks
 ISO/IEC 8631:1989 Information technology - Program constructs and conventions for their representation
 ISO/IEC 8632 Information technology – Computer graphics – Metafile for the storage and transfer of picture description information
 ISO/IEC 8632-1:1999 Part 1: Functional specification
 ISO/IEC 8632-2:1992 Part 2: Character encoding [withdrawn 2001-06-21]
 ISO/IEC 8632-3:1999 Part 3: Binary encoding
 ISO/IEC 8632-4:1999 Part 4: Clear text encoding
 ISO 8637:2010 Cardiovascular implants and extracorporeal systems – Haemodialysers, haemodiafilters, haemofilters and haemoconcentrators
 ISO 8638:2010 Cardiovascular implants and extracorporeal systems – Extracorporeal blood circuit for haemodialysers, haemodiafilters and haemofilters
 ISO 8640 Textile machinery and accessories – Flat warp knitting machines
 ISO 8640-1:2004 Part 1: Vocabulary of basic structure and knitting elements
 ISO 8640-2:2004 Part 2: Vocabulary of warp let-off, fabric take-up and batching
 ISO 8640-3:2002 Part 3: Vocabulary of patterning devices
 ISO 8640-4:1996 Part 4: Stitch bonding machines and stitch bonding devices
 ISO 8648:1988 Information processing systems – Open Systems Interconnection – Internal organization of the Network Layer
 ISO/IEC 8650 Information technology – Open Systems Interconnection – Protocol specification for the Association Control Service Element
 ISO/IEC 8650-2:1997 Protocol Implementation Conformance Statement (PICS) proforma
 ISO 8651 Information technology – Computer graphics – Graphical Kernel System (GKS) language bindings
 ISO 8651-1:1988 Part 1: FORTRAN
 ISO 8651-2:1988 Part 2: Pascal
 ISO 8651-3:1988 Part 3: Ada
 ISO/IEC 8651-4:1995 Part 4: C
 ISO/IEC 8652:2012 Information technology – Programming languages – Ada
 ISO 8653:1986 Jewellery – Ring-sizes – Definition, measurement and designation
 ISO 8655 Piston-operated volumetric apparatus
 ISO 8655-1:2002 Part 1: Terminology, general requirements and user recommendations
 ISO 8655-2:2002 Part 2: Piston pipettes
 ISO 8655-3:2002 Part 3: Piston burettes
 ISO 8655-4:2002 Part 4: Dilutors
 ISO 8655-5:2002 Part 5: Dispensers
 ISO 8655-6:2002 Part 6: Gravimetric methods for the determination of measurement error
 ISO 8655-7:2005 Part 7: Non-gravimetric methods for the assessment of equipment performance
 ISO 8669 Urine collection bags
 ISO 8669-1:1988 Part 1: Vocabulary
 ISO 8670 Ostomy collection bags
 ISO 8670-1:1988 Part 1: Vocabulary
 ISO 8691 Petroleum products – Low levels of vanadium in liquid fuels – Determination by flameless atomic absorption spectrometry after ashing
 ISO 8695:2010 Tools for pressing - Punches - Nomenclature and terminology
 ISO/TR 8713:2012 Electrically propelled road vehicles – Vocabulary
 ISO 8769:2016 Reference sources - Calibration of surface contamination monitors - Alpha-, beta- and photon emitters
 ISO 8777:1993 Information and documentation - Commands for interactive text searching
 ISO 8784 Pulp, paper and board – Microbiological examination
 ISO 8784-1:2014 Part 1: Enumeration of bacteria and bacterial spores based on disintegration
 ISO 8785:1998 Geometrical Product Specification (GPS) - Surface imperfections - Terms, definitions and parameters
 ISO 8790:1987 Information processing systems - Computer system configuration diagram symbols and conventions
 ISO/IEC 8802 Information technology – Telecommunications and information exchange between systems – Local and metropolitan area networks – Specific requirements
 ISO/IEC/IEEE 8802-A:2015 Part A: Overview and architecture
 ISO/IEC TR 8802-1:2001 Part 1: Overview of Local Area Network Standards
 ISO/IEC/IEEE 8802-1Q:2016 Part 1Q: Bridges and bridged networks
 ISO/IEC/IEEE 8802-1X:2013 Part 1X: Port-based network access control
 ISO/IEC/IEEE 8802-1AB:2017 Part 1AB: Station and media access control connectivity discovery
 ISO/IEC/IEEE 8802-1AE:2013 Part 1AE: Media access control (MAC) security
 ISO/IEC/IEEE 8802-1AR:2014 Part 1AR: Secure device identity
 ISO/IEC/IEEE 8802-1AS:2014 Part 1AS: Timing and synchronization for time-sensitive applications in bridged local area networks
 ISO/IEC/IEEE 8802-1AX:2016 Part 1AX: Link aggregation
 ISO/IEC/IEEE 8802-1BA:2016 Part 1BA: Audio video bridging (AVB) systems
 ISO/IEC/IEEE 8802-1BR:2016 Part 1BR: Virtual bridged local area networks – Bridge port extension
 ISO/IEC 8802-2:1998 Part 2: Logical link control
 ISO/IEC/IEEE 8802-3:2017 Part 3: Standard for Ethernet
 ISO/IEC/IEEE 8802-3-1:2015 Part 3-1: Standard for management information base (MIB) – Definitions for Ethernet
 ISO/IEC 8802-5:1998 Part 5: Token Ring access method and physical layer specifications
 ISO/IEC/IEEE 8802-11:2012 Part 11: Wireless LAN medium access control (MAC) and physical layer (PHY) specifications
 ISO/IEC/IEEE 8802-15-4:2010 Part 15-4: Wireless medium access control (MAC) and physical layer (PHY) specifications for low-rate wireless personal area networks (WPANs)
 ISO/IEC/IEEE 8802-22:2015 Part 22: Cognitive Wireless RAN Medium Access Control (MAC) and Physical Layer (PHY) Specifications: Policies and Procedures for Operation in the TV Bands
 ISO 8805 Information processing systems – Computer graphics – Graphical Kernel System for Three Dimensions (GKS-3D) functional description
 ISO/IEC 8806 Information technology – Computer graphics – Graphical Kernel System for Three Dimensions (GKS-3D) language bindings
 ISO/IEC 8806-4 Part 4: C
 ISO 8807:1989 Information processing systems – Open Systems Interconnection – LOTOS – A formal description technique based on the temporal ordering of observational behaviour
 ISO 8811:2000 Earth-moving machinery – Rollers and compactors – Terminology and commercial specifications
 ISO 8812:2016 Earth-moving machinery – Backhoe loaders – Terminology and commercial specifications
 ISO 8815:1994 Aircraft – Electrical cables and cable harnesses – Vocabulary
 ISO/IEC 8822:1994 Information technology – Open Systems Interconnection – Presentation service definition
 ISO/IEC 8823 Information technology – Open Systems Interconnection – Connection-oriented presentation protocol
 ISO/IEC 8823-1:1994 Protocol specification
 ISO/IEC 8823-2:1997 Protocol Implementation Conformance Statement (PICS) proforma
 ISO/IEC 8824 Information technology – Abstract Syntax Notation One (ASN.1)
 ISO/IEC 8824-1:2015 Specification of basic notation
 ISO/IEC 8824-2:2015 Information object specification
 ISO/IEC 8824-3:2015 Constraint specification
 ISO/IEC 8824-4:2015 Parameterization of ASN.1 specifications
 ISO/IEC 8825 Information technology – ASN.1 encoding rules
 ISO/IEC 8825-1:2015 Specification of Basic Encoding Rules (BER), Canonical Encoding Rules (CER) and Distinguished Encoding Rules (DER)
 ISO/IEC 8825-2:2015 Specification of Packed Encoding Rules (PER)
 ISO/IEC 8825-3:2015 Specification of Encoding Control Notation (ECN)
 ISO/IEC 8825-4:2015 XML Encoding Rules (XER)
 ISO/IEC 8825-5:2015 Mapping W3C XML schema definitions into ASN.1
 ISO/IEC 8825-6:2015 Registration and application of PER encoding instructions
 ISO/IEC 8825-7:2015 Part 7: Specification of Octet Encoding Rules (OER)
 ISO 8826 Technical drawings – Rolling bearings
 ISO 8826-1:1989 Part 1: General simplified representation
 ISO 8826-2:1994 Part 2: Detailed simplified representation
 ISO 8827:1988 Implants for surgery – Staples with parallel legs for orthopaedic use – General requirements
 ISO 8828:2014 Implants for surgery – Guidance on care and handling of orthopaedic implants
 ISO 8835 Inhalational anaesthesia systems
 ISO 8835-7:2011 Part 7: Anaesthetic systems for use in areas with limited logistical supplies of electricity and anaesthetic gases
 ISO 8836:2014 Suction catheters for use in the respiratory tract
 ISO 8843:2005 Aircraft – Crimp-removable contacts for electrical connectors – Identification system
 ISO 8855:2011 Road vehicles – Vehicle dynamics and road-holding ability – Vocabulary
 ISO/IEC 8859 Information technology – 8-bit single-byte coded graphic character sets
 ISO/IEC 8859-1:1998 Part 1: Latin alphabet No. 1
 ISO/IEC 8859-2:1999 Part 2: Latin alphabet No. 2
 ISO/IEC 8859-3:1999 Part 3: Latin alphabet No. 3
 ISO/IEC 8859-4:1998 Part 4: Latin alphabet No. 4
 ISO/IEC 8859-5:1999 Part 5: Latin/Cyrillic alphabet
 ISO/IEC 8859-6:1999 Part 6: Latin/Arabic alphabet
 ISO/IEC 8859-7:2003 Part 7: Latin/Greek alphabet
 ISO/IEC 8859-8:1999 Part 8: Latin/Hebrew alphabet
 ISO/IEC 8859-9:1999 Part 9: Latin alphabet No. 5
 ISO/IEC 8859-10:1998 Part 10: Latin alphabet No. 6
 ISO/IEC 8859-11:2001 Part 11: Latin/Thai alphabet
 ISO/IEC 8859-13:1998 Part 13: Latin alphabet No. 7
 ISO/IEC 8859-14:1998 Part 14: Latin alphabet No. 8 (Celtic)
 ISO/IEC 8859-15:1999 Part 15: Latin alphabet No. 9
 ISO/IEC 8859-16:2001 Part 16: Latin alphabet No. 10
 ISO 8860 Information processing – Data interchange on 90 mm (3.5 in) flexible disk cartridges using modified frequency modulation recording at 7 958 ftprad on 80 tracks on each side
 ISO 8860-1:1987 Part 1: Dimensional, physical and magnetic characteristics
 ISO 8860-2:1987 Part 2: Track format
 ISO 8871 Elastomeric parts for parenterals and for devices for pharmaceutical use
 ISO 8871-1:2003 Part 1: Extractables in aqueous autoclavates
 ISO 8871-2:2003 Part 2: Identification and characterization
 ISO 8871-3:2003 Part 3: Determination of released-particle count
 ISO 8871-4:2006 Part 4: Biological requirements and test methods
 ISO 8871-5:2016 Part 5: Functional requirements and testing
 ISO 8872:2003 Aluminium caps for transfusion, infusion and injection bottles – General requirements and test methods
 ISO/IEC 8877:1992 Information technology – Telecommunications and information exchange between systems – Interface connector and contact assignments for ISDN Basic Access Interface located at reference points S and T
 ISO/IEC 8878:1992 Information technology – Telecommunications and information exchange between systems – Use of X.25 to provide the OSI Connection-mode Network Service
 ISO 8879:1986 Information processing – Text and office systems – Standard Generalized Markup Language (SGML)
 ISO/IEC 8880 Information technology — Telecommunications and information exchange between systems — Protocol combinations to provide and support the OSI Network Service
 ISO/IEC 8880-1:1990 Part 1: General principles [Withdrawn: replaced by ISO/IEC TR 13532:1995, now withdrawn without replacement]
 ISO/IEC 8880-2:1992 Part 2: Provision and support of the connection-mode Network Service [Withdrawn: replaced by ISO/IEC TR 13532:1995, now withdrawn without replacement]
 ISO/IEC 8880-3:1990 Part 3: Provision and support of the connectionless-mode Network Service [Withdrawn: replaced by ISO/IEC TR 13532:1995, now withdrawn without replacement]
 ISO/IEC 8881:1989 Information processing systems – Data communications – Use of the X.25 packet level protocol in local area networks
 ISO/IEC 8882 Information technology – Telecommunications and information exchange between systems – X.25 DTE conformance testing
 ISO/IEC 8882-1:1996 Part 1: General principles
 ISO/IEC 8882-2:2000 Part 2: Data link layer conformance test suite
 ISO/IEC 8882-3:2000 Part 3: Packet layer conformance test suite
 ISO 8884:1989 Information processing — Text and office systems — Keyboards for multiple Latin-alphabet languages — Layout and operation [Withdrawn: replaced with ISO 9995-(1,7)]
 ISO 8885:1987 Information processing systems — Data communication — High-level data link control procedures — General purpose XID frame information field content and format [Withdrawn without replacement]
 ISO/IEC 8886:1996 Information technology – Open Systems Interconnection – Data link service definition
 ISO 8887 Technical product documentation – Design for manufacturing, assembling, disassembling and end-of-life processing
 ISO 8887-1:2017 Part 1: General concepts and requirements
 ISO 8891:1998 Dental casting alloys with noble metal content of at least 25 % but less than 75 % [Withdrawn: replaced with ISO 22674]
 ISO 8909 Forage harvesters
 ISO 8909-1:1994 Part 1: Vocabulary
 ISO 8910:1993 Machinery and equipment for working the soil – Mouldboard plough working elements – Vocabulary
 ISO 8927:1991 Earth-moving machinery – Machine availability – Vocabulary
 ISO 8930:1987 General principles on reliability for structures – List of equivalent terms
 ISO 8936:2017 Awnings for leisure accommodation vehicles - Requirements and test methods
 ISO 8954 Ferroalloys - Vocabulary
 ISO 8954-1:1990 Part 1: Materials
 ISO 8954-2:1990 Part 2: Sampling and sample preparation
 ISO 8954-3:1990 Part 3: Sieve analysis
 ISO 8957:1996 Information and documentation - Hebrew alphabet coded character sets for bibliographic information interchange
 ISO 8965:2013 Logging industry – Technology – Terms and definitions
 ISO 8979:2004 Pliers and nippers for electronics - Nomenclature
 ISO 8980 Ophthalmic optics – Uncut finished spectacle lenses
 ISO 8980-1:2017 Part 1: Specifications for single-vision and multifocal lenses
 ISO 8980-2:2017 Part 2: Specifications for power-variation lenses
 ISO 8980-3:2013 Part 3: Transmittance specifications and test methods
 ISO 8980-4:2006 Part 4: Specifications and test methods for anti-reflective coatings
 ISO 8980-5:2005 Part 5: Minimum requirements for spectacle lens surfaces claimed to be abrasion-resistant
 ISO 8999:2001 Reciprocating internal combustion engines - Graphical symbols

ISO 9000 – ISO 9999 

 ISO 9000:2015 Quality management systems – Fundamentals and vocabulary
 ISO 9001:2015 Quality management systems – Requirements
 ISO/TS 9002:2016 Quality management systems – Guidelines for the application of ISO 9001:2015
 ISO 9004:2018 Managing for the sustained success of an organization – A quality management approach
 ISO/TR 9007:1987 Information processing systems - Concepts and terminology for the conceptual schema and the information base
 ISO 9019:1995 Securities – Numbering of certificates
 ISO 9022 Optics and optical instruments - Environmental test methods
 ISO 9022-1:2016 Definitions, extent of testing
 ISO 9022-2:2015 Cold, heat and humidity
 ISO 9022-3:2015 Mechanical stress
 ISO 9022-4:2014 Salt mist
 ISO 9022-5:1994 Combined cold, low air pressure [Withdrawn: replaced by ISO 9022-23:2016]
 ISO 9022-6:2015 Dust
 ISO 9022-23:2016 Low pressure combined with cold, ambient temperature and dry or damp heat
 ISO 9031:1987 Air cargo equipment - Handling systems for unit load devices (ULDs) - Symbols for pictorial representation
 ISO 9036:1987 Information processing - Arabic 7-bit coded character set for information interchange
 ISO/IEC 9040:1997 Information technology – Open Systems Interconnection – Virtual Terminal Basic Class Service
 ISO/IEC 9041 Information technology – Open Systems Interconnection – Virtual Terminal Basic Class Protocol
 ISO/IEC 9041-1:1997 Part 1: Specification
 ISO/IEC 9041-2:1997 Part 2: Protocol Implementation Conformance Statement (PICS) proforma
 ISO 9045:1990 Industrial screens and screening – Vocabulary
 ISO 9050 Glass in building – Determination of light transmittance, solar direct transmittance, total solar energy transmittance, ultraviolet transmittance and related glazing factors
 ISO 9060: Solar energy -- Specification and classification of instruments for measuring hemispherical solar and direct solar radiation
 ISO/IEC 9066 Information technology – Open Systems Interconnection – Reliable Transfer
 ISO/IEC 9066-1:1989 Part 1: Model and service definition
 ISO/IEC 9066-2:1989 Part 2: Protocol specification
 ISO/IEC 9066-3:1996 Protocol Implementation Conformance Statement (PICS) proforma
 ISO 9069:1988 Information processing – SGML support facilities – SGML Document Interchange Format (SDIF)
 ISO/IEC 9070:1991 Information technology - SGML support facilities - Registration procedures for public text owner identifiers
 ISO/IEC 9072 Information technology – Open Systems Interconnection – Remote Operations
 ISO/IEC 9072-1:1989 Part 1: Model, notation and service definition
 ISO/IEC 9072-2:1989 Part 2: Protocol specification
 ISO/IEC 9072-3:1996 Protocol Implementation Conformance Statement (PICS) proforma
 ISO/IEC 9075 Information technology – Database languages – SQL
 ISO 9086 Wood – Methods of physical and mechanical testing – Vocabulary
 ISO 9086-1:1987 Part 1: General concepts and macrostructure
 ISO 9092:2011 Textiles – Nonwovens – Definition
 ISO 9095:1990 Steel tubes – Continuous character marking and colour coding for material identification
 ISO 9123:2001 Measurement of liquid flow in open channels – Stage-fall-discharge relationships
 ISO/IEC 9126 Software engineering – Product quality
 ISO 9128:2006 Road vehicles - Graphical symbols to designate brake fluid types
 ISO 9141 Road vehicles – Diagnostic systems
 ISO 9141-2 CARB requirements for interchange of digital information
 ISO 9141-3 Verification of the communication between vehicle and OBD II scan tool
 ISO 9144:1991 Securities – Optical character recognition line – Position and structure
 ISO 9160:1988 Information processing - Data encipherment - Physical layer interoperability requirements
 ISO 9170 Terminal units for medical gas pipeline systems
 ISO 9170-1:2017 Part 1: Terminal units for use with compressed medical gases and vacuum
 ISO 9170-2:2008 Part 2: Terminal units for anaesthetic gas scavenging systems
 ISO/IEC 9171 Information technology - 130 mm optical disk cartridge, write once, for information interchange
 ISO/IEC 9171-1:1990 Part 1: Unrecorded optical disk cartridge
 ISO/IEC 9171-2:1990 Part 2: Recording format
 ISO 9175 Tubular tips for hand-held technical pens using India ink on tracing paper
 ISO 9175-1:1988 Part 1: Definitions, dimensions, designation and marking
 ISO 9177 Mechanical pencils for technical drawings
 ISO 9177-1:2016 Part 1: Classification, dimensions, performance requirements and testing
 ISO 9177-2:1989 Part 2: Black leads – Classification and dimensions
 ISO 9177-3:1994 Part 3: Black leads – Bending strengths of HB leads
 ISO 9180:1988 Black leads for wood-cased pencils – Classification and diameters
 ISO 9186 Graphical symbols - Test methods
 ISO 9186-1:2014 Part 1: Method for testing comprehensibility
 ISO 9186-2:2008 Part 2: Method for testing perceptual quality
 ISO 9186-3:2014 Part 3: Method for testing symbol referent association
 ISO 9187 Injection equipment for medical use
 ISO 9187-1:2010 Part 1: Ampoules for injectables
 ISO 9187-2:2010 Part 2: One-point-cut (OPC) ampoules
 ISO 9195:1992 Liquid flow measurement in open channels – Sampling and analysis of gravel-bed material
 ISO 9196:1992 Liquid flow measurement in open channels – Flow measurements under ice conditions
 ISO 9211 Optics and photonics - Optical coatings
 ISO 9211-1:2010 Part 1: Definitions
 ISO/TR 9212:2015 Hydrometry – Methods of measurement of bedload discharge
 ISO 9222 Technical drawings – Seals for dynamic application
 ISO 9222-1:1989 Part 1: General simplified representation
 ISO 9222-2:1989 Part 2: Detailed simplified representation
 ISO 9223 Corrosion of metals and alloys - Corrosivity of atmospheres - Classification, determination and estimation
 ISO 9224 Corrosion of metals and alloys - Corrosivity of atmospheres - Guiding values for the corrosivity categories
 ISO 9225 Corrosion of metals and alloys - Corrosivity of atmospheres - Measurement of environmental parameters affecting corrosivity of atmospheres
 ISO 9226 Corrosion of metals and alloys - Corrosivity of atmospheres - Determination of corrosion rate of standard specimens for the evaluation of corrosivity
 ISO 9227:2017 Corrosion tests in artificial atmospheres – Salt spray tests
 ISO 9229:2007 Thermal insulation - Vocabulary
 ISO 9230:2007 Information and documentation - Determination of price indexes for print and electronic media purchased by libraries
 ISO 9232:2003 Yogurt – Identification of characteristic microorganisms (Lactobacillus delbrueckii subsp. bulgaricus and Streptococcus thermophilus)
 ISO 9235:2013 Aromatic natural raw materials – Vocabulary
 ISO 9241 Ergonomics of human-system interaction
 ISO 9244:2008 Earth-moving machinery - Machine safety labels - General principles
 ISO 9245:1991 Earth-moving machinery – Machine productivity – Vocabulary, symbols and units
 ISO 9247:1990 Earth-moving machinery – Electrical wires and cables – Principles of identification and marking
 ISO/TS 9250 Earth-moving machinery – Multilingual listing of equivalent terms
 ISO/TS 9250-1:2012 Part 1: General
 ISO/TS 9250-2:2012 Part 2: Performance and dimensions
 ISO 9251:1987 Thermal insulation - Heat transfer conditions and properties of materials - Vocabulary
 ISO 9264:1988 Woodworking machines – Narrow belt sanding machines with sliding table or frame – Nomenclature
 ISO 9265:1988 Woodworking machines – Multi-spindle boring machines – Nomenclature
 ISO 9266:1988 Woodworking machines – Universal tool and cutter sharpeners – Nomenclature
 ISO 9267:1988 Woodworking machines – Bandsaw blade sharpening machines – Nomenclature
 ISO 9268:1988 Implants for surgery – Metal bone screws with conical under-surface of head – Dimensions
 ISO 9269:1988 Implants for surgery – Metal bone plates – Holes and slots corresponding to screws with conical under-surface
 ISO/IEC 9281 Information technology - Picture coding methods
 ISO/IEC 9281-1:1990 Part 1: Identification
 ISO/IEC 9281-2:1990 Part 2: Procedure for registration
 ISO/IEC 9282 Information processing - Coded representation of pictures
 ISO/IEC 9282-1:1988 Part 1: Encoding principles for picture representation in a 7-bit or 8-bit environment
 ISO 9288:1989 Thermal insulation – Heat transfer by radiation – Physical quantities and definitions
 ISO/IEC 9293:1994 Information technology – Volume and file structure of disk cartridges for information interchange
 ISO 9295:2015 Acoustics - Determination of high-frequency sound power levels emitted by machinery and equipment
 ISO 9296:2017 Acoustics - Declared noise emission values of information technology and telecommunications equipment
 ISO 9300:2005 Measurement of gas flow by means of critical flow Venturi nozzles
 ISO 9308 Water quality – Enumeration of Escherichia coli and coliform bacteria
 ISO 9308-1:2014 Part 1: Membrane filtration method for waters with low bacterial background flora
 ISO 9308-2:2012 Part 2: Most probable number method
 ISO 9308-3:1998 Part 3: Miniaturized method (Most Probable Number) for the detection and enumeration of E. coli in surface and waste water
 ISO 9314 Information processing systems Fibre Distributed Data Interface (FDDI)
 ISO 9314-1:1989 Part 1: Token Ring Physical Layer Protocol (PHY)
 ISO 9314-2:1989 Part 2: Token Ring Media Access Control (MAC)
 ISO/IEC 9314-3:1990 Part 3: Physical Layer Medium Dependent (PMD)
 ISO/IEC 9314-4:1999 Part 4: Single Mode Fibre Physical Layer Medium Dependent (SMF-PMD)
 ISO/IEC 9314-5:1995 Part 5: Hybrid Ring Control (HRC)
 ISO/IEC 9314-6:1998 Part 6: Station Management (SMT)
 ISO/IEC 9314-7:1998 Part 7: Physical layer Protocol (PHY-2)
 ISO/IEC 9314-8:1998 Part 8: Media Access Control-2 (MAC-2)
 ISO/IEC 9314-9:2000 Part 9: Low-cost fibre physical layer medium dependent (LCF-PMD)
 ISO/IEC 9314-13:1998 Part 13: Conformance Test Protocol Implementation Conformance Statement (CT-PICS) Proforma
 ISO/IEC 9314-20:2001 Part 20: Abstract test suite for FDDI physical medium dependent conformance testing (FDDI PMD ATS)
 ISO/IEC 9314-21:2000 Part 21: Abstract test suite for FDDI physical layer protocol conformance testing (FDDI PHY ATS)
 ISO/IEC 9314-25:1998 Part 25: Abstract test suite for FDDI - Station Management Conformance Testing (SMT-ATS)
 ISO/IEC 9314-26:2001 Part 26: Media Access Control Conformance Testing (MAC-ATS)
 ISO 9315:1989 Information processing systems - Interface between flexible disk cartridge drives and their host controllers
 ISO/IEC 9316:1995 Information technology - Small Computer System Interface-2
 ISO/IEC 9316-2:2000 Information technology - Small computer system interface-2 (SCSI-2) - Part 2: Common Access Method (CAM) Transport and SCSI interface module
 ISO/IEC 9318 Information technology - Intelligent Peripheral Interface
 ISO/IEC 9318-2:1990 Part 2: Device specific command set for magnetic disk drives
 ISO/IEC 9318-3:1990 Part 3: Device generic command set for magnetic and optical disk drives
 ISO/IEC 9318-4:2002 Part 4: Device generic command set for magnetic tape drives (IPI-3 tape)
 ISO 9334:2012 Optics and photonics - Optical transfer function - Definitions and mathematical relationships
 ISO 9335:2012 Optics and photonics - Optical transfer function - Principles and procedures of measurement
 ISO 9342 Optics and optical instruments – Test lenses for calibration of focimeters
 ISO 9342-1:2005 Part 1: Test lenses for focimeters used for measuring spectacle lenses
 ISO 9342-2:2005 Part 2: Test lenses for focimeters used for measuring contact lenses
 ISO 9346:2007 Hygrothermal performance of buildings and building materials – Physical quantities for mass transfer – Vocabulary
 ISO 9360 Anaesthetic and respiratory equipment – Heat and moisture exchangers (HMEs) for humidifying respired gases in humans
 ISO 9360-1:2000 Part 1: HMEs for use with minimum tidal volumes of 250 ml
 ISO 9360-2:2001 Part 2: HMEs for use with tracheostomized patients having minimum tidal volumes of 250 ml
 ISO 9362:2014 Banking – Banking telecommunication messages – Business identifier code (BIC)
 ISO 9368 Measurement of liquid flow in closed conduits by the weighing method – Procedures for checking installations
 ISO 9368-1:1990 Part 1: Static weighing systems
 ISO 9394:2012 Ophthalmic optics – Contact lenses and contact lens care products – Determination of biocompatibility by ocular study with rabbit eyes
 ISO 9407 Shoe sizes – Mondopoint system of sizing and marking
 ISO 9431:1990 Construction drawings – Spaces for drawing and for text, and title blocks on drawing sheets
 ISO/TR 9464:2008 Guidelines for the use of ISO 5167:2003
 ISO 9488:1999 Solar energy - Vocabulary
 ISO 9493:2010 Geometrical product specifications (GPS) – Dimensional measuring equipment: Dial test indicators (lever type) – Design and metrological characteristics
 ISO/IEC 9496:2003 CHILL - The ITU-T programming language
 ISO 9506 Industrial automation systems - Manufacturing Message Specification
 ISO/IEC 9529 Information processing systems - Data interchange on 90 mm (3,5 in) flexible disk cartridges using modified frequency modulation recording at 15 916 ftprad, on 80 tracks on each side
 ISO/IEC 9541 Information technology – Font information interchange
 ISO/IEC 9541-1:2012 Part 1: Architecture
 ISO/IEC 9541-2:2012 Part 2: Interchange Format
 ISO/IEC 9541-3:2012 Part 3: Glyph shape representation
 ISO/IEC 9541-4:2009 Part 4: Harmonization to Open Font Format
 ISO 9542:1988 Information processing systems – Telecommunications and information exchange between systems – End system to Intermediate system routeing exchange protocol for use in conjunction with the Protocol for providing the connectionless-mode network service (ISO 8473)
 ISO 9543:1989 Information processing systems – Information exchange between systems – Synchronous transmission signal quality at DTE/DCE interfaces
 ISO/IEC 9545:1994 Information technology – Open Systems Interconnection – Application Layer structure
 ISO/TR 9547:1988 Programming language processors - Test methods - Guidelines for their development and acceptability
 ISO/IEC 9548 Information technology – Open Systems Interconnection – Connectionless Session protocol
 ISO/IEC 9548-1:1996 Protocol specification
 ISO/IEC 9548-2:1995 Protocol Implementation Conformance Statement (PICS) proforma
 ISO/IEC 9549:1990 Information technology – Galvanic isolation of balanced interchange circuit
 ISO 9555 Measurement of liquid flow in open channels – Tracer dilution methods for the measurement of steady flow
 ISO 9555-1:1994 Part 1: General
 ISO 9555-3:1992 Part 3: Chemical tracers
 ISO 9555-4:1992 Part 4: Fluorescent tracers
 ISO 9564 Financial services – Personal Identification Number (PIN) management and security
 ISO 9568:1993 Cinematography – Background acoustic noise levels in theatres, review rooms and dubbing rooms
 ISO/IEC TR 9573:1988 Information processing - SGML support facilities - Techniques for using SGML
 ISO/IEC TR 9573-11:2004 Part 11: Structure descriptions and style specifications for standards document interchange
 ISO/IEC TR 9573-13:1991 Part 13: Public entity sets for mathematics and science
 ISO/IEC 9574:1992 Information technology – Provision of the OSI connection-mode network service by packet mode terminal equipment to an integrated services digital network (ISDN)
 ISO/IEC TR 9575:1995 Information technology – Telecommunications and information exchange between systems – OSI Routeing Framework
 ISO/IEC 9576 Information technology – Open Systems Interconnection – Connectionless Presentation protocol
 ISO/IEC 9576-1:1995 Protocol specification
 ISO/IEC 9576-2:1995 Protocol Implementation Conformance Statement (PICS) proforma
 ISO/IEC TR 9577:1999 Information technology – Protocol identification in the network layer
 ISO/IEC TR 9578:1990 Information technology – Communication interface connectors used in local area networks
 ISO/IEC 9579:2000 Information technology – Remote database access for SQL with security enhancement
 ISO 9583:1993 Implants for surgery – Non-destructive testing – Liquid penetrant inspection of metallic surgical implants
 ISO 9584:1993 Implants for surgery – Non-destructive testing – Radiographic examination of cast metallic surgical implants
 ISO 9585:1990 Implants for surgery – Determination of bending strength and stiffness of bone plates
 ISO/IEC 9592 Information technology – Computer graphics and image processing – Programmer's Hierarchical Interactive Graphics System (PHIGS)
 ISO/IEC 9593 Information technology – Computer graphics – Programmer's Hierarchical Interactive Graphics System (PHIGS) language bindings
 ISO/IEC 9594 Information technology – Open Systems Interconnection – The Directory
 ISO/IEC 9594-1:2017 Part 1: Overview of concepts, models and services
 ISO/IEC 9594-2:2017 Part 2: Models
 ISO/IEC 9594-3:2017 Part 3: Abstract service definition
 ISO/IEC 9594-4:2017 Part 4: Procedures for distributed operation
 ISO/IEC 9594-5:2017 Part 5: Protocol specifications
 ISO/IEC 9594-6:2017 Part 6: Selected attribute types
 ISO/IEC 9594-7:2017 Part 7: Selected object classes
 ISO/IEC 9594-8:2017 Part 8: Public-key and attribute certificate frameworks
 ISO/IEC 9594-9:2017 Part 9: Replication
 ISO/IEC 9595:1998 Information technology – Open Systems Interconnection – Common management information service
 ISO/IEC 9596 Information technology – Open Systems Interconnection – Common management information protocol
 ISO/IEC 9596-1:1998 Part 1: Specification
 ISO/IEC 9596-2:1993 Protocol Implementation Conformance Statement (PICS) proforma
 ISO 9611:1996 Acoustics – Characterization of sources of structure-borne sound with respect to sound radiation from connected structures – Measurement of velocity at the contact points of machinery when resiliently mounted
 ISO 9613 Acoustics – Attenuation of sound during propagation outdoors
 ISO 9613-1:1993 Part 1: Calculation of the absorption of sound by the atmosphere
 ISO 9613-2:1996 Part 2: General method of calculation
 ISO 9614 Acoustics – Determination of sound power levels of noise sources using sound intensity
 ISO 9614-1:1993 Part 1: Measurement at discrete points
 ISO 9614-2:1996 Part 2: Measurement by scanning
 ISO 9614-3:2002 Part 3: Precision method for measurement by scanning
 ISO 9626:2016 Stainless steel needle tubing for the manufacture of medical devices – Requirements and test methods
 ISO/IEC 9636 Information technology - Computer graphics - Interfacing techniques for dialogues with graphical devices (CGI) - Functional specification
 ISO/IEC 9636-1:1991 Part 1: Overview, profiles, and conformance
 ISO/IEC 9636-2:1991 Part 2: Control
 ISO/IEC 9636-3:1991 Part 3: Output
 ISO/IEC 9636-4:1991 Part 4: Segments
 ISO/IEC 9636-5:1991 Part 5: Input and echoing
 ISO/IEC 9636-6:1991 Part 6: Raster
 ISO/IEC 9637 Information technology - Computer graphics - Interfacing techniques for dialogues with graphical devices (CGI) – Data stream binding
 ISO/IEC 9637-1:1994 Part 1: Character encoding
 ISO/IEC 9637-2:1992 Part 2: Binary encoding
 ISO/IEC 9638 Information technology - Computer graphics - Interfacing techniques for dialogues with graphical devices (CGI) - Language bindings
 ISO/IEC 9638-3:1994 Part 3: Ada
 ISO 9645:1990 Acoustics – Measurement of noise emitted by two-wheeled mopeds in motion – Engineering method
 ISO/IEC 9646 Information technology—Open Systems Interconnection—Conformance testing methodology and framework
 ISO/IEC 9646-1:1994 Part 1: General concepts
 ISO/IEC 9646-2:1994 Part 2: Abstract Test Suite specification
 ISO/IEC 9646-3:1998 Part 3: The Tree and Tabular Combined Notation (TTCN)
 ISO/IEC 9646-4:1994 Part 4: Test realization
 ISO/IEC 9646-5:1994 Part 5: Requirements on test laboratories and clients for the conformance assessment process
 ISO/IEC 9646-6:1994 Part 6: Protocol profile test specification
 ISO/IEC 9646-7:1995 Part 7: Implementation Conformance Statements
 ISO 9660:1988 Information processing – Volume and file structure of CD-ROM for information interchange
 ISO/IEC 9661:1994 Information technology – Data interchange on 12,7 mm wide magnetic tape cartridges – 18 tracks, 1 491 data bytes per millimetre
 ISO 9662:1994 Aircraft equipment - Environmental and operating conditions for airborne equipment - Humidity, temperature and pressure tests
 ISO 9668:1990 Pulps — Determination of magnesium content — Flame atomic absorption spectrometric method [Withdrawn: replaced with ISO 12830]
 ISO 9687:2015 Dentistry - Graphical symbols for dental equipment
 ISO 9688:1990 Mechanical vibration and shock – Analytical methods of assessing shock resistance of mechanical systems – Information exchange between suppliers and users of analyses
 ISO 9696:2007 Water quality - Measurement of gross alpha activity in non-saline water - Thick source method
 ISO 9706:1994 Information and documentation – Paper for documents – Requirements for permanence
 ISO 9707:2008 Information and documentation - Statistics on the production and distribution of books, newspapers, periodicals and electronic publications
 ISO 9712:2012 Non-destructive testing - Qualification and certification of NDT personnel
 ISO 9713:2002 Neurosurgical implants – Self-closing intracranial aneurysm clips
 ISO 9714 Orthopaedic drilling instruments
 ISO 9714-1:2012 Part 1: Drill bits, taps and countersink cutters
 ISO 9735:1988 Electronic data interchange for administration, commerce and transport (EDIFACT) – Application level syntax rules (Syntax version number: 4, Syntax release number: 2)
 ISO 9735-1:2002 Part 1: Syntax rules common to all parts
 ISO 9735-2:2002 Part 2: Syntax rules specific to batch EDI
 ISO 9735-3:2002 Part 3: Syntax rules specific to interactive EDI
 ISO 9735-4:2002 Part 4: Syntax and service report message for batch EDI (message type – CONTRL)
 ISO 9735-5:2002 Part 5: Security rules for batch EDI (authenticity, integrity and non-repudiation of origin)
 ISO 9735-6:2002 Part 6: Secure authentication and acknowledgement message (message type – AUTACK)
 ISO 9735-7:2002 Part 7: Security rules for batch EDI (confidentiality)
 ISO 9735-8:2002 Part 8: Associated data in EDI
 ISO 9735-9:2002 Part 9: Security key and certificate management message (message type – KEYMAN)
 ISO 9735-10:2014 Part 10: Syntax service directories
 ISO/IEC 9796 Information technology – Security techniques – Digital signature schemes giving message recovery
 ISO/IEC 9796-2:2010 Part 2: Integer factorization based mechanisms
 ISO/IEC 9796-3:2006 Part 3: Discrete logarithm based mechanisms
 ISO/IEC 9797 Information technology – Security techniques – Message Authentication Codes (MACs)
 ISO/IEC 9797-1:2011 Part 1: Mechanisms using a block cipher
 ISO/IEC 9797-2:2011 Part 2: Mechanisms using a dedicated hash-function
 ISO/IEC 9797-3:2011 Part 3: Mechanisms using a universal hash-function
 ISO/IEC 9798 Information technology – Security techniques – Entity authentication
 ISO/IEC 9798-1:2010 Part 1: General
 ISO/IEC 9798-2:2008 Part 2: Mechanisms using symmetric encipherment algorithms
 ISO/IEC 9798-3:1998 Part 3: Mechanisms using digital signature
 ISO/IEC 9798-4:1999 Part 4: Mechanisms using a cryptographic check function
 ISO/IEC 9798-5:2009 Part 5: Mechanisms using zero-knowledge techniques
 ISO/IEC 9798-6:2010 Part 6: Mechanisms using manual data transfer
 ISO 9801:2009 Ophthalmic instruments – Trial case lenses
 ISO 9802:1996 Raw optical glass – Vocabulary
 ISO/IEC 9804:1998 Information technology – Open Systems Interconnection – Service definition for the Commitment, Concurrency and Recovery service element
 ISO/IEC 9805 Information technology – Open Systems Interconnection – Protocol for the Commitment, Concurrency and Recovery service element
 ISO/IEC 9805-1:1998 Protocol specification
 ISO/IEC 9805-2:1996 Protocol Implementation Conformance Statement (PICS) proforma
 ISO/TR 9824:2007 Hydrometry – Measurement of free surface flow in closed conduits
 ISO 9825:2005 Hydrometry – Field measurement of discharge in large rivers and rivers in flood
 ISO 9826:1992 Measurement of liquid flow in open channels – Parshall and SANIIRI flumes
 ISO 9827:1994 Measurement of liquid flow in open channels by weirs and flumes – Streamlined triangular profile weirs
 ISO/IEC 9834 Information technology – Open Systems Interconnection – Procedures for the operation of OSI Registration Authorities
 ISO/IEC 9834-1:2012 General procedures and top arcs of the international object identifier tree
 ISO/IEC 9834-2:1993 Part 2: Registration procedures for OSI document types
 ISO/IEC 9834-3:2008 Registration of Object Identifier arcs beneath the top-level arc jointly administered by ISO and ITU-T
 ISO/IEC 9834-4:1991 Part 4: Register of VTE Profiles
 ISO/IEC 9834-5:1991 Part 5: Register of VT Control Object Definitions
 ISO/IEC 9834-6:2005 Registration of application processes and application entities
 ISO/IEC 9834-7:2008 Joint ISO and ITU-T Registration of International Organizations
 ISO/IEC 9834-8:2014 Part 8: Generation of universally unique identifiers (UUIDs) and their use in object identifiers
 ISO/IEC 9834-9:2008 Registration of object identifier arcs for applications and services using tag-based identification
 ISO 9846 Solar energy -- Calibration of a pyranometer using a pyrheliometer
 ISO 9847 Solar energy -- Calibration of field pyranometers by comparison to a reference pyranometer
 ISO 9849:2017 Optics and optical instruments - Geodetic and surveying instruments - Vocabulary
 ISO 9851:1990 Continuous mechanical handling equipment – Overhead electrical monorail conveyors – Definitions and safety rules
 ISO 9869 Thermal insulation – Building elements – In-situ measurements of thermal resistance and thermal transmittance
 ISO 9873:2017 Dentistry - Intra-oral mirrors
 ISO 9878:1990 Micrographics - Graphical symbols for use in microfilming
 ISO 9897:1997 Freight containers - Container equipment data exchange (CEDEX) - General communication codes
 ISO/IEC 9899:2018 Programming languages – C
 ISO 9902 Textile machinery – Noise test code
 ISO 9902-1:2001 Part 1: Common requirements
 ISO 9902-2:2001 Part 2: Spinning preparatory and spinning machinery
 ISO 9902-3:2001 Part 3: Nonwoven machinery
 ISO 9902-4:2001 Part 4: Yarn processing, cordage and rope manufacturing machinery
 ISO 9902-5:2001 Part 5: Weaving and knitting preparatory machinery
 ISO 9902-6:2001 Part 6: Fabric manufacturing machinery
 ISO 9902-7:2001 Part 7: Dyeing and finishing machinery
 ISO 9926 Cranes – Training of operators
 ISO 9926-1:1990 Part 1: General
 ISO 9926-3:2016 Part 3: Tower cranes
 ISO/IEC/IEEE 9945:2009 Information technology – Portable Operating System Interface (POSIX®) Base Specifications, Issue 7
 ISO 9947:2005 Textile machinery and accessories – Two-for-one twisters – Vocabulary
 ISO 9949 Urine absorbing aids - Vocabulary
 ISO 9949-1:1993 Part 1: Conditions of urinary incontinence
 ISO 9949-2:1993 Part 2: Products
 ISO 9949-3:1993 Part 3: Identification of product types
 ISO 9951:1993 Measurement of gas flow in closed conduits – Turbine meters
 ISO 9957 Fluid draughting media
 ISO 9957-1:1992 Part 1: Water-based India ink – Requirements and test conditions
 ISO 9957-2:1995 Part 2: Water-based non-India ink – Requirements and test conditions
 ISO 9957-3:1997 Part 3: Water-based coloured draughting inks – Requirements and test conditions
 ISO 9958 Draughting media for technical drawings – Draughting film with polyester base
 ISO 9958-1:1992 Part 1: Requirements and marking
 ISO 9958-2:1992 Part 2: Determination of properties
 ISO 9959 Numerically controlled draughting machines – Drawing test for the evaluation of performance
 ISO 9959-1:1992 Part 1: Vector plotters
 ISO 9960 Draughting instruments with or without graduation
 ISO 9960-1:1992 Part 1: Draughting scale rules
 ISO 9961:1992 Draughting media for technical drawings – Natural tracing paper
 ISO 9962 Manually operated draughting machines
 ISO 9962-1:1992 Part 1: Definitions, classification and designation
 ISO 9962-2:1992 Part 2: Characteristics, performance, inspection and marking
 ISO/IEC 9973:2013 Information technology - Computer graphics, image processing and environmental data representation - Procedures for registration of items
 ISO 9984:1996 Information and documentation – Transliteration of Georgian characters into Latin characters
 ISO 9985:1996 Information and documentation – Transliteration of Armenian characters into Latin characters
 ISO 9992 Financial transaction cards – Messages between the integrated circuit card and the card accepting device
 ISO/IEC 9995 Information technology – Keyboard layouts for text and office systems
 ISO 9997:1999 Dental cartridge syringes
 ISO 9999 Assistive products for persons with disability – Classification and terminology

Notes

References

External links 
 International Organization for Standardization
 ISO Certification Provider
 ISO Consultant

International Organization for Standardization